is a former Japanese football player. He played for Japan national team.

Club career
Imai was born in Kyoto on November 19, 1950. After graduating from Doshisha University, he joined Towa Real Estate (later Fujita Industries) in 1973. The club won the league champions in 1977 and 1979. The club also won 1977 and 1979 Emperor's Cup. He retired in 1980. He played 139 games and scored 3 goals in the league. He was selected Japanese Footballer of the Year awards in 1980 and Best Eleven for 4 years in a row (1977-1980).

National team career
In September 1974, Imai was selected Japan national team for 1974 Asian Games. At this competition, on September 3, he debuted against Philippines. In March 1977, he played for Japan for the first time in 3 years at 1978 World Cup qualification. In 1978, he was also selected Japan for 1978 Asian Games. In 1980, he played at 1980 Summer Olympics qualification. This qualification was his last game for Japan. He played 29 games for Japan until 1980.

National team statistics

References

External links
 
 Japan National Football Team Database

1950 births
Living people
Doshisha University alumni
Association football people from Kyoto Prefecture
Japanese footballers
Japan international footballers
Japan Soccer League players
Shonan Bellmare players
Footballers at the 1974 Asian Games
Footballers at the 1978 Asian Games
Association football defenders
Asian Games competitors for Japan